is a Japanese seinen manga series written and illustrated by Tomonori Inoue. The story follows three high school girls who were genetically engineered to be impervious to radioactivity and sent to Tokyo after the city was contaminated by a nuclear accident.

Coppelion began its serialization in Young Magazine from 2008 to May 7, 2012 before moving to Monthly Young Magazine from 2012 to 2016. The series has currently been collected into twenty-four volumes by Kodansha. Coppelion Vol. 3 made it to the Oricon best seller chart at number 29 during the week of April 7, 2009. While the manga has yet to be available in print form in North America, it is currently available in English as part of a read-only/download-only subscription from Crunchyroll and Kodansha.

List of chapters

References

Coppelion